Villa Rio Esporte Clube, usually known simply as Villa Rio, is a Brazilian professional football team from the city of Rio de Janeiro, Rio de Janeiro state founded in 2004.

History
On April 10, 2004, the club was founded by Álvaro, Renato Correia de Souza, Fábio da Silva Baptista, Maria Rosa and Bárbara Correia de Souza. Bárbara Correia de Souza was chosen as the club's first president.

Club colors
The club colors are dark green, orange and white.

Mascot
Villa Rio's mascot is a common bottlenose dolphin.

References

External links
 Official website

 
Association football clubs established in 2004
Football clubs in Rio de Janeiro (state)
Football clubs in Rio de Janeiro (city)
2004 establishments in Brazil